Fear Before is the fourth and final full-length album by the experimental rock band, Fear Before. The album was released on October 28, 2008, by Equal Vision Records and was produced by Casey Bates and recorded at Johnny Cab Studios and London Bridge studio in Seattle. This is the first album on which they do not use their former name "Fear Before the March of Flames".

On September 22, 2008, the band released the song "Fear Before Doesn't Listen To People Who Don't Like Them" in mp3 format exclusively to those on their mailing list. The song is now on their MySpace.

Track listing

Personnel
Fear Before
 Adam R. Fisher – guitars, keyboards, vocals, programming
 Clayton "Goose" Holyoak – drums
 Michael L. Madruga – bass guitar
 David M. Marion – vocals
 Zachary M. Hutchings – guitars

Guest vocals
 Robert Smith of Heavy Heavy Low Low – on track 4
 Zach Carothers of Portugal. The Man – on track 6
 Dreu Damian of I Am The Ocean – on tracks 7 and 10
 Thomas Erak of The Fall of Troy – on track 10
 Quentin Smith of Vaux – on track 10

Production
 Produced and engineered by Casey Bates
 Mastered by Will Quinnell
 Art by David Bell

Additional information
The song "Jabberwocky" is named after the Jabberwocky nonsense poem written by Lewis Carroll. This is the first album where former drummer Brandon Proff does not provide artwork and also the first album not to have some form of skyscrapers on the cover. Instead, David Bell who directed the music video for "Taking Cassandra to the End of the World Party" provides artwork. Also, this is the first album where the majority of the lyrics are written by the lead vocalist, David Marion. On previous albums, the lead guitarist and back up vocalist Adam Rupert Fisher wrote the majority of the lyrics.

References

External links
Album press release on Equal Vision website

Fear Before albums
Equal Vision Records albums
2008 albums